The Charter of Liberties, also called the Coronation Charter, or Statutes of the Realm, was a written proclamation by Henry I of England, issued upon his accession to the throne in 1100. It sought to bind the King to certain laws regarding the treatment of nobles, church officials, and individuals. The nineteenth-century historians Frederick Maitland and Frederick Pollock considered it a landmark document in English legal history and a forerunner of Magna Carta.

The document addressed abuses of royal power by his predecessor William II (his brother William Rufus), as perceived by the nobility, specifically the over-taxation of the barons, the abuse of vacant sees, and the practices of simony and pluralism.

The Charter of Liberties was generally ignored by monarchs, until in 1213 Stephen Langton, Archbishop of Canterbury, reminded the nobles that their liberties had been guaranteed over a century prior in Henry I's Charter of Liberties.

Background

Henry I of England, nicknamed Beauclerc, was the fourth and youngest son of William I (William the Conqueror) by his queen Matilda of Flanders. The name Beauclerc was given because Henry was well educated, being able to read and write Latin, and possessed a knowledge of English law and natural history. He had received 5,000 pounds of silver from his father, but no land holdings. He used this to purchase a district in the Cotentin Peninsula in Normandy for 3,000 pounds from his brother Robert of Normandy. Robert had been left the Duchy of Normandy by their father, but needed money. Various political intrigues occurred in France, which led to the imprisonment of Henry for two years by his brother William II, then King of England. In 1096, Robert left Normandy for the First Crusade. Henry swore fealty to William, who took over Normandy in Robert's absence. William was killed in a hunting accident on 2 August 1100. (Henry was present on this hunting trip.) With William dead and Robert absent, Henry claimed the English crown.

Henry was immediately faced with three political problems. (1) The earls and barons did not accept him. (2) There was antagonism from the Church, especially Archbishop Anselm of Canterbury. (3) The native Anglo-Saxon population was not receptive to the new king.

Henry made concessions to the Church and reconciled with Anselm. He married Edith, the daughter of King Malcolm III of Scotland, who was of mixed Anglo-Scots heritage, and so garnered great favour with the Anglo-Saxons. She changed her name to the Norman Mathilda. However, the choice displeased the barons and earls. Henry needed to mollify the nobles and secure his throne.

William II, the son of William the Conqueror and brother of Henry Beauclerc, had issued a charter in 1093, when he was ill and fearing death. The text of this charter has been lost to history. It is believed to have freed prisoners, forgiven debts, and assured that holy and good laws would be maintained. Whatever promises William made, he quickly broke after he recovered his health.

Henry went further. He negotiated with the leading barons and earls, making various concessions to them. When all sides were agreed, the agreement was issued as the Charter of Liberties.

Summary 

After a traditional greeting, the Charter of Liberties contained fourteen declarations, summarised as follows:

Henry, king of the English, to Bishop Samson and Urso de Abetot and all his barons and faithful, both French and English, of Worcestershire, [copies were sent to all the shires] greeting.

Aftermath

William I had been a great admirer of the laws of Edward the Confessor. He had reformed many laws in an effort to make the law of Edward the common law of England while establishing a strong Norman rule and custom. During the entire Norman period, there was little legislation.

Henry began his reign with the Charter of Liberties, sending a strong message: he was returning to his father's ways, which were viewed with great nostalgia. The perceived abuses of William II were to be abolished. The corruption and larceny of reliefs, wardships, marriages, murder fines and so forth, was to end. Debts and past offences were to be forgiven. The demesne lands and military tenants were to be freed from the danegeld of Danelaw. Above all, the “laga Eadwardii” Law of Edward the Confessor, as amended by William I, would be restored. The proclamation was made with the assumption that the barons would make the same concessions to their tenants as the king had promised to them. Plucknett is of the opinion that this good will probably did flow down the feudal chain. The Charter was not legislation, but rather a promise to return to the law, as it existed in the time of William I, before it had been corrupted by William II.

The promises made in the Charter could not be enforced. There is ample evidence that Henry I ignored them. The Pipe Rolls which came thirty-one years into Henry's reign indicate he had extended the power of the crown well beyond the limits set in the Charter. The establishment of the Exchequer, ostensibly to end corruption and fraud in the taking and holding of taxes, in reality, led to greater power of the crown. The direction of its chief minister, Bishop Roger of Salisbury, evolved the law for tenants in chief which became the harshest and most severe in Europe. This occurred silently, and placed precedent upon precedent. Early in his reign, Henry issued a writ declaring the county and hundred courts should be held as in the days of Edward the Confessor. These had the result of bringing the ancient traditional tribunals in accordance with newer Norman methods. Chroniclers of the age state that  Henry legislated about theft, restored capital punishment (which had been suspended for a great many crimes by William II), and harshly treated utterers of bad money and rapacious exactions of his courtiers. He made his roving court and army the terror of every neighborhood. Henry made the measure of his own arm the standard ell.

The drowning of his son, William, in the loss of the White Ship in 1120, led to the end of the Norman dynasty. Stephen of England claimed the throne in 1135. He was the last Norman king. His conflict with Henry's daughter Matilda led to The Anarchy.

Plucknett describes the Charter of Liberties as a forerunner to legislation in later years. There was no legislation as such either under the Saxons or the Normans. The Charter was a great concession, born of political need. Large portions of the charter were a withdrawal of practices which were of questionable legality, and corrosive politically. Various feudal dues, instead of being arbitrary and ad hoc, were declared to be reduced to reasonable limits. The Charter led to an obscure decree of Stephen (1135–1154), the statutum decretum that established where there was no son, daughters would inherit. This was remarkable in its day, and pre-dated the reforms of Henry II of England.

The problems with the Church had been brewing for some time. William I had tried to invest bishops with his temporal seal. Pope Gregory VII in 1075 had prohibited lay investiture, holding the Church was independent of the state. A long struggle ensued. This was still going on when Henry I assumed the throne and entered into open conflict with Anselm. This conflict was moderated and ameliorated by the canon lawyer Ivo of Chartres. It was agreed that Henry could observe the selection of bishops, without interference. This accord was extended to all of Europe by 1122. The Concordat of Worms in 1122 did not last, but only changed the nature of tension between Church and State. The government of Henry I at Westminster became exquisitely effective. The mechanism of Norman government needed a strong hand. Stephen was not up to it. Henry's death was viewed as a great tragedy for several centuries:

During the reign of Stephen, Henry I came to be known as the "Lion of Justice".

The Charter of Liberties was a precedent for Magna Carta (Great Charter) of 1215, at the end of the reign of John of England.

References

Bibliography

External links
 Text of the Charter. Archived from the original on 15 November 2018.
 Text of the Charter at Internet Medieval Sourcebook, part of Internet History Sourcebooks Project

1100 in England
English laws
Constitutional laws of England
Political charters
Medieval charters and cartularies of England
Henry I of England
Medieval English law
Political history of medieval England
11th century in law